The Star-Herald, or the Scottsbluff Star-Herald, is a newspaper serving the city of Scottsbluff and surrounding areas in Nebraska, United States. The paper is published daily, except Mondays.

History

Founding
The Star-Herald had its beginning in two separate newspapers. In 1900, Ernest Moon established the Scottsbluff Herald in Scottsbluff. In 1906 the Mitchell Star was founded by P. J. Barron in nearby Mitchell. In 1907 the Star's publication was moved to Scottsbluff and the paper was renamed the Scottsbluff Star. In 1912, Asa B. Wood, owner of the Gering Courier, and Harry J. Wisner purchased both the Herald and Star and consolidated them into a single newspaper under the title of the Star-Herald.

The paper's main competitor was the Scottsbluff Republican.

Ownership
The Wood family continued to own a half stake in the newspaper until 1966. In November 1968 the heirs of Harry Wisner sold their stock in the newspaper to the Seacrest Family's Western Publishing Co. The Seacrest family also owned the Lincoln Journal and North Platte Telegraph. The Western Publishing Co., including the Star-Herald, was acquired by the Omaha World-Herald Company in February 2000. The Omaha World-Herald Company was in turn purchased by Berkshire Hathaway in 2011.

The Star-Herald was part of Berkshire Hathaway's subsidiary BH Media Group, although starting in 2018 it was managed by Lee Enterprises. In January 2020 it was announced that Lee Enterprises was purchasing Berkshire Hathaway's newspaper holdings. 

The paper shares resources with two other nearby newspapers, the Gering Courier and the Hemingford Ledger, both also owned by Lee Enterprises.

References

Newspapers published in Nebraska
Scotts Bluff County, Nebraska
Lee Enterprises publications